Multi-objective reinforcement learning (MORL) is a form of reinforcement learning concerned with conflicting alternatives. It is distinct from multi-objective optimization in that it is concerned with agents acting in environments.

References

Reinforcement learning